Lathyrus jepsonii is a species of wild pea known by the common names delta tule pea and Jepson's pea. It is endemic to California, where it grows in a number of habitat types, including forest and estuary.

This is a perennial herb with a long, winged stem which climbs by means of branched, coiled tendrils. The leaves are made up of several pairs of lance-shaped leaflets. The plant bears an inflorescence of up to 15 pink or purplish flowers each up to 2 centimeters wide. The fruit is a hairless, dehiscent legume pod.

There are two varieties of this species. 
Lathyrus jepsonii var. californicus is a smaller plant which is sometimes hairy, 
Lathyrus jepsonii  var. jepsonii this rare variety can exceed two meters in height and is hairless, a rare variety which grows in the estuary habitat of the Sacramento-San Joaquin River Delta, the origin of the common name delta tule pea.

References

External links
Jepson Manual Treatment
Photo gallery

jepsonii
Endemic flora of California
Flora of the Sierra Nevada (United States)
Natural history of the California chaparral and woodlands
Natural history of the California Coast Ranges
Vines
Flora without expected TNC conservation status
Taxa named by Edward Lee Greene